Peterchurch is a village and civil parish in the Golden Valley, Herefordshire, England. The countryside around is spectacular, with views of the Black Mountains but the village itself is architecturally undistinguished, except for the award-winning 'church reordering' scheme within the Norman church, carried out in 2012 by the Herefordshire-based architects Communion Design.

Population
In 1848 the population was 745.  The population of the civil parish at the 2011 census was 1,091.

Church
The Norman church, dedicated to St. Peter, built on the unusual basilica model with four, rather than three chambers.  The church's foundations are thought to go back to 786, and parts of the Saxon walls can be seen in the sanctuary.  The original stone altar is in place, dating back to well before the Reformation. 

The original church spire was removed in about 1950. The modern spire is made of fibreglass and was installed in 1972. It was for a time, the tallest fibreglass spire in the country.

Robert Jones, recipient of the Victoria Cross for his role at Rorke's Drift, is buried in St Peter's Churchyard.

Railways
The village was formerly served by a station on the Golden Valley Railway from 1881 until its closure in the 1950s.

Well
The well, St. Peter's Well, was supposed to have curative properties with respect to diseases of the eye.

See also
Fairfield High School, Peterchurch

References

External links

Villages in Herefordshire
Civil parishes in Herefordshire